Houma (YTB-811) was a United States Navy  named for Houma, Louisiana.

Construction
The contract for Houma was awarded 22 June 1970. She was laid down on 1 December 1970 at Sturgeon Bay, Wisconsin, by Peterson Builders and launched 8 May 1971.

Operational history
Delivered to the Navy 23 September 1971, Houma served at Naval Base Roosevelt Roads, San Juan, Puerto Rico.

Stricken from the Navy List 9 November 1999, ex-Houma was sold by the Defense Reutilization and Marketing Service (DRMS), 6 March 2003, to Marine Tug LLC, Falmouth, Maine.  Later acquired by McAllister Towing, ex-Houma was renamed Stacy McAllister.

References

External links
 

 

Natick-class large harbor tugs
1971 ships
Ships built by Peterson Builders